The 1967–68 season of the Moroccan Throne Cup was the 12th edition of the competition.

Racing de Casablanca won the cup, beating Raja de Casablanca 1–0 in the final, played at the Stade d'honneur in Casablanca. Racing de Casablanca won the title for the first time in their history. It was also the first final to be a derby, where both clubs come from the same city.

Tournament

Last 16

Quarter-finals

Semi-finals

Final 

The final took place between the two winning semi-finalists, Racing de Casablanca and Raja de Casablanca, on 14 July 1968 at the Stade d'honneur in Casablanca.

Notes and references 

1967
1967 in association football
1968 in association football
1967–68 in Moroccan football